FV Engers 07 is a German association football club based in the city of Engers, Rhineland-Palatinate.

History
The club was founded in 1907 as FC Viktoria Engers on 10 July 1907 and later that same year was joined by FC Roland Engers.  This combined club then itself joined the gymnastics club Turnverein 1879 Engers in 1910.  The footballers resumed their independence as Fußballverein Engers in 1916.

They won their first honours in 1913 as champions of the local C division Bezirk Koblenz.  In 1919, FV captured the B division title and then won promotion to top flight regional competition in 1923. In the early 30s the team took part in qualification play for the Gauliga Mittelrhein, one of sixteen top-flight divisions formed in the 1933 reorganization of German football under the Third Reich, but was initially unsuccessful, losing to 1. FC Idar. By the 1941–42 season, the Gauliga Mittelrhein had been split into the Gauliga Köln-Aachen and the Gauliga Moselland, where Engers played in the Gruppe Ost for three seasons as a lower table side until the division collapsed towards the end of World War II.

Immediately following the war the footballers played in the top regional amateur competition before advancing to the Oberliga Südwest-Nord (I) in 1949 where they would remain until sent down after a next to last place finish in 1953. They re-appeared in the first division for a single season in 1955–56, spending most of the 50s and the early 60s in the 2. Oberliga Südwest (II). In 1963, the Bundesliga, Germany's first professional national league, was formed and the country's football competitions were re-structured. Engers failed to qualify to stay up in second division play and landed in the Amateurliga Rheinland (III).

In 1967, Engers celebrated their 60th anniversary with a second-place finish, participation in the opening round of the national amateur championship, and an advance to the final of the Rhineland Pokal. The following season the club plunge to the bottom of the division and were relegated to lower tier local competition. They quickly recovered themselves and played another five seasons in the Amateurliga Rheinland as a lower table side before again disappearing.

A 1981 Kreisliga title advanced FV to the Berzirksliga where they finished second and won the subsequent promotion playoff to move up to the Landesliga Nord (VI) in 1983. Another second-place finish earned the team participation in the promotion round for the Verbandsliga Rheinland (V) where they lost to Untermosel. Two seasons later they redeemed themselves and were promoted.

After five seasons in the Oberliga the club was relegated to the Rheinlandliga in 2008, followed by another relegation in 2012, now to the Bezirksliga. It made an immediate return, winning the Bezirksliga in 2013.

Honours
The club's honours:
 2nd Oberliga Südwest (II)
 Runners-up: 1955
 Verbandsliga Rheinland (V)
 Champions: 2002
 Bezirksliga Rheinland-Ost (VII)
 Champions: 2013
 Rhineland Cup
 Champions: 2020, 2022

Recent seasons
The recent season-by-season performance of the club:

With the introduction of the Regionalligas in 1994 and the 3. Liga in 2008 as the new third tier, below the 2. Bundesliga, all leagues below dropped one tier. In 2012 the Oberliga Südwest was renamed Oberliga Rheinland-Pfalz/Saar.

References

External links
 Official team page
 Das deutsche Fußball-Archiv historical German domestic league tables 

Football clubs in Germany
Football clubs in Rhineland-Palatinate
Association football clubs established in 1907
1907 establishments in Germany